= Floor loan =

A floor loan refers to the minimum amount of money that a lender is willing to lend in order to enable the builder to begin the construction of a building that is to be occupied by tenants. The term is thus closely associated with mortgage and property loans. The rest of the loan's balance (called "holdback") is given to the builder upon the achievement of certain milestones related to the sale or lease of its residential space. For example, a bank may advance 80% of the balance of a property loan to the builder, and release the remaining 20% upon the successful construction lease or sale of the building's residential units. This partition of funding means the lower risk for lender.

A word floor is used for more financial terms in financial area and means minimum, e.g. the interest rate floor is the lowest interest rate the lender can offer you to an adjustable (sometimes called variable) rate mortgage.

== Floor to ceiling loan ==
The related term is a floor to ceiling loan. In this type of loan there are two separate funding amounts: first upon satisfactory completion of construction and the second when a building is fully occupied by tenants or cash flows claimed by lender are fulfilled. The additional funds between floor and ceiling needed for construction costs are called "gap".
